Ja Thak Wa uprising was a revolt led by two ethnic Cham leaders, Ja Thak Wa and Po War Palei, against the Vietnamese government under Emperor Minh Mạng in 19th century southern Vietnam.

Events
Northern Champa was conquered by the Dai Viet in 1471 but the Cham kept various forms of autonomy until 1832 (Panduranga and Principality of Thuận Thành). The Chams were forced to adopt Vietnamese customs.

After the Katip Sumat uprising was put down, Ja Thak Wa (Thầy Điền or Điên Sư), another Muslim cleric, launched another revolt against Vietnamese in 1834. Ja Thak Wa chose Chek Bicham (Phố Châm Sơn) as his base area; he crowned Po War Palei (La Bôn Vương), a son-in-law of the last deputy ruler Po Dhar Kaok (Nguyễn Văn Nguyên), as the new Champa king. The rebels attacked Ninh Thuận, Bình Thuận, Khánh Hòa and Phú Yên. They were supported by Montagnard in Central Highlands.

The rebellion was put down in July 1835, though both Ja Thak Wa and Po War Palei were killed in Phan Rang earlier in May. In the same year, two Cham leaders, Po Phaok The (Nguyễn Văn Thừa) and Po Dhar Kaok (Nguyễn Văn Nguyên) were executed by the Emperor.

After Ja Thak Wa, Vietnamese royal documents also recorded one more uprising in the former Panduranga, led by two Cham sisters, Thị Tiết and Thị Cân Oa, in 1836.

References

See also 
Ja Lidong rebellion
Nduai Kabait rebellion
Lê Văn Khôi revolt
Katip Sumat uprising 
History of the Cham–Vietnamese wars

 

19th century in Vietnam
Military history of Vietnam
Rebellions in the Nguyễn dynasty
Rebellions in Asia
1834 in Vietnam
1835 in Vietnam
Conflicts in 1834
Conflicts in 1835
19th-century rebellions
History of Champa
Islam and violence
Jihad
History of Ninh Thuận Province
History of Bình Thuận Province
History of Khánh Hòa Province
History of Phú Yên Province
Violence against indigenous peoples